Nuwakot District (a part of Bagmati Province, is one of the seventy-seven districts of Nepal.
It is a historically important district in Nepal. Prithvi Narayan Shah died in Devighat of Nuwakot.

The district contains places of historical significance such as the town of Nuwakot, and the village of Devighat located at the confluence of the Tadi and Trishuli Rivers. Kakani is popular among Nepalese people as a touristic place and picnic spot. Nuwakot holds the different reminance from the unification movement pioneered by late king Prithvi Narayan Shah to the present situation.

Etymology
The name, 'Nuwakot', is made up of two words 'nawa' and 'kort'. 'Nawa' means nine in Nepali and 'kort' means sacred religious sites at the top of hill. The district accordingly has nine hills over which various deities are said to dwell thus overseeing and protecting Nuwakot. This has led Nuwakot often being called "City of nine hills". The Gorkhali king Prithivi Narayan Shah invaded Nuwakot which was under the ruling of Jaya Prakash Malla and made Nuwakot the capital of his kingdom.

Geography and climate

Demographics
At the time of the 2011 Nepal census, Nuwakot District had a population of 277,471. Of these, 54.5% spoke Nepali, 40.1% Tamang, 2.0% Newari, 0.9% Lepcha, 0.4% Gurung, 0.4% Kumhali, 0.4% Rai, 0.2% Magar, 0.2% Sherpa, 0.1% Bhojpuri, 0.1% Ghale, 0.1% Hindi, 0.1% Yolmo, 0.1% Maithili, 0.1% Urdu and 0.2% other languages as their first language.

In terms of ethnicity/caste, 43.0% were Tamang, 19.0% Hill Brahmin, 12.5% Chhetri, 7.4% Newar, 3.6% Rai, 3.2% Kami, 2.3% Magar, 1.7% Damai/Dholi, 1.7% Sarki, 1.0% Gurung, 0.9% Kumal, 0.6% Sanyasi/Dasnami, 0.5% Gharti/Bhujel, 0.4% Ghale, 0.3% other Dalit, 0.3% Thakuri, 0.2% Majhi, 0.2% Sherpa, 0.1% Badi, 0.1% Danuwar, 0.1% Yolmo, 0.1% Musalman, 0.1% Sonar, 0.1% Sunuwar and 0.4% others.

In terms of religion, 57.8% were Hindu, 40.0% Buddhist, 1.6% Christian, 0.2% Kirati, 0.1% Muslim and 0.3% others.

In terms of literacy, 59.5% could read and write, 3.6% could only read and 36.7% could neither read nor write.

Administration
The district consists of 12 municipalities, out of which two are urban municipalities and ten are rural municipalities. These are as follows:
Bidur Municipality
Belkotgadhi Municipality
Kakani Rural Municipality
Panchakanya Rural Municipality
Likhu Rural Municipality
Dupcheshwar Rural Municipality
Shivapuri Rural Municipality
Tadi Rural Municipality
Suryagadhi Rural Municipality
Tarkeshwar Rural Municipality
Kispang Rural Municipality
Myagang Rural Municipality

Economy 
Nuwakot, being a hilly area with very less plains, most of the areas are still undeveloped. In last few years, huge changes are observable. The city areas are provided with schools, colleges, hospitals and the road infrastructure is also developed. Two hydro power stations are currently in operation, and from 2020 the first part of the biggest solar power station (Nuwakot Solar Power Station) was consented to the electric grid of Nepal. People are dependent on agriculture, teaching, foreign economy, livestock farming, business, hotels, Agro Tourism, Eco-Tourism and Khadya Bank, etc.

Special Economic Zone 
Jiling is recognized as an SEZ Area where business flourishes and there is an intent to grow business and economy of Nuwakot. NEPAL KHADYA BANK LTD. has established at Kashitar to serve farmers in Food Security, Food Banking, Grain Storage, Supply and Distribution.

See 
Nuwakot, Bagmati : A seven-storey palace lies on the top of Bidur Municipality. Views of Nuwakot can be observed from the spot.

Trishuli River : One of the major river of Saptagandaki passes right through mid area of Nuwakot.

Kakani : A gateway from Kathmandu to Nuwakot. A common place for observing sunset and the mountains.

Devighat : Near the union of Trishuli and Suryamati (Tadi) river lies devighat. This place is historically important. The death place of the great king Prithvi Narayan Shah lies here.

Kashitar : One of the major place where people work in Eco Tourism, Agri Tourism and Food Security.

Religious places 
Nuwakot, being mainly Hindu by religion, has many historically as well as religiously important places.

 Bhairavi Temple
 Jalpa devi Temple
 Dupcheshwar Mahadev Temple
 Chimteshor Mahadev
 Bandevi Temple
 Panchakanya Temple
 Indra Kamala Temple

Indrakamala Mai Temple is a religious and cultural place in Nuwakot district, which is 18 km far from Bidur the headquarter of Nuwakot and 8 km from Kakani Rural Municipality Office. It lies in the Kakani Rural Municipality ward number -8 under Bagmati province. It is surrounded with natural greenery and located at the beach of the three gorges where thousands of devotees come for worshiping god Indrakamala basically in Dashain. It is believed to achieved aims and desires after worshiping.

See also
Nuwakot, Bagmati
Bidur
Kakani

Notable people
Mahendra Bahadur Pandey
Ram Sharan Mahat
Arjun Narasingha KC
Prakash Chandra Lohani
Kedar Narsingh KC
Narayan Prasad Khatiwada
Kishor Nepal

References

 

 
Districts of Nepal established during Rana regime or before
Districts of Bagmati Province